Saab Lofton is an author, cartoonist and radio personality. He lives in Seattle, Washington, United States.

Lofton graduated from The Evergreen State College in Olympia, Washington. After graduation, Lofton moved to Las Vegas where he hosted the "Saab Lofton Power Hour" for KLAV 1230 AM radio and wrote a column for the Las Vegas CityLife.

Lofton's work includes A.D., a novel he wrote while a student at San Francisco State University. Lofton's second novel is called Battle Neverending. Lofton formerly published a column in the discontinued Seattle Sinner, an alternative newspaper, and self-publishes an underground comic book called "Rufus the Black Cat".

References

Bibliography

External links

 Profile at Evergreen State College
 A.D. at III Publishing

20th-century American male writers
20th-century American non-fiction writers
20th-century American novelists
American male journalists
American male novelists
Living people
Year of birth missing (living people)